The term Dawan may refer to:

Places

China

Towns
 Dawan, Chongqing, in Yubei District
 Dawan, Gaoyao, in Gaoyao District, Guangdong
 Dawan, Guiping, in Guiping district, Guangxi
 Dawan, Guizhou, in Zhongshan District, Liupanshui
 Dawan, Jilin, in Meihekou
 Dawan, Yunnan, in Zhenxiong County

Townships
 Dawan Township, Guangxi, in Xingbin District, Laibin
 Dawan Township, Ningxia, in Jingyuan County
 Dawan Township, Sichuan, in Dechang County
 Dawan, Huarong District, former township in Ezhou, Hubei

Other places
 Dawan District, a subdistrict of Klungkung, Bali, Indonesia
 Dawan, a barangay of Mati, Davao Oriental, Philippines
 Dawan, an administrative division of Yongkang District, Taiwan

Other uses
 Atoni, also known as Dawan, an ethnic group on Timor
 Dayuan, a historical people of West China (pinyin spelling)
 Dawan language, an Austronesian language spoken by Atoni people of West Timor
 a character in the short story Sing to the Dawn by the Chinese-American writer Minfong Ho
 Dàwàn, the original Chinese title of the film, Big Shot's Funeral

See also
 Davan (disambiguation)